The discography of American singer Kehlani consists of three studio albums, three mixtapes, and 70 singles (including 26 as a featured artist). Kehlani released their debut commercial mixtape, Cloud 19, exclusively on August 26, 2014, and released it on streaming services on its seven-year anniversary in 2021. They released their second commercial mixtape, You Should Be Here, on April 28, 2015, which reached number 36 on the Billboard 200. On January 27, 2017, Kehlani released their debut studio album, SweetSexySavage, which reached number three on the Billboard 200. In 2018, Kehlani was featured on American rapper Cardi B's single, "Ring", from her debut studio album, Invasion of Privacy, which reached number 28 on the Billboard Hot 100. They released their third commercial mixtape, While We Wait, on February 22, 2019, which reached number nine on the Billboard 200. On May 8, 2020, Kehlani released their second studio album, It Was Good Until It Wasn't, which debuted and peaked at number two on the Billboard 200. On April 29, 2022, they released their third studio album, Blue Water Road, which debuted and peaked at number 13 on the Billboard 200.

Albums

Studio albums

Mixtapes

Singles

As lead artist

As featured artist

Promotional singles

Other charted and certified songs

Guest appearances

Notes

References

Contemporary R&B discographies
Discographies of American artists
Discography